State Road 602 (NM 602) is a  state highway in the US state of New Mexico. NM 602's southern terminus is at NM 53 east of Black Rock, and the northern terminus is at Interstate 40 (I-40) and U.S. Route 491 (US 491) in Gallup.

Major intersections

See also

References

602
Transportation in McKinley County, New Mexico